The men's road race competition of the cycling events at the 2019 Pan American Games was held on August 10 at the Circuito San Miguel.

Schedule

Results
50 riders from 18 countries was started

References

Cycling at the 2019 Pan American Games
Road cycling at the Pan American Games